JuJuan Laray Cooley (born January 31, 1982) is an American basketball player who played for six years in Romania for the BC Mureș team between 2006–2012. In the 2009 off-season, he decided to give it a try in the NBA Development League.

Career statistics

Awards and honors

NAIA 1st Team All-American 2005
Romanian All Star Game Selection 2007
Romanian All Star Game Selection 2008
Led League In Assists 2009
Romanian All-Star Game MVP 2009

Personal life

Cooley graduated magna cum laude in Business Administration with Alpha Chi honors at Indiana Tech, in 2005. His interests are video games, computers and movies.

External links
JuJuan Cooley's hi5
JuJuan Cooley at BC Mureș
Up to date statistics
BC Mureș Website
Photo Gallery

Living people
1982 births
African-American basketball players
American expatriate basketball people in Romania
Basketball players from Flint, Michigan
Indiana Tech Warriors men's basketball players
BC Mureș players
Point guards
American men's basketball players
21st-century African-American sportspeople
20th-century African-American people